The Caribou River is a  river in northern Minnesota, the United States. It rises in a swamp about .6 miles (1 km) south of Morris Lake and two miles (3.2 km) east of Echo Lake, near the Lake/Cook County line, at an altitude about 1620 feet (494 m) above sea level. It descends some 1,020 (311 m.) feet in elevation as it flows south to its mouth at Lake Superior, also near the eastern border of Lake County.

Habitat
The Caribou River is a designated trout stream with populations of brook and rainbow trout.

See also
List of rivers of Minnesota

References

Rivers of Minnesota
Tributaries of Lake Superior
Rivers of Lake County, Minnesota
Northern Minnesota trout streams